Szymon Włodarczyk (born 5 January 2003) is a Polish professional footballer who plays as a forward for Górnik Zabrze.

Club career
On 1 December 2021, he scored his first goal for Legia Warsaw, in the Polish Cup away fixture against Motor Lublin 2–1.

On 25 May 2022, he moved on free transfer to Górnik Zabrze, signing a three-year contract.

Personal life
Włodarczyk is the son of Piotr Włodarczyk, a former Polish international and Legia Warsaw forward.

Career statistics

Club

Notes

Honours
Individual
Ekstraklasa Young Player of the Month: October 2022

References

2003 births
Living people
Polish footballers
Poland youth international footballers
Poland under-21 international footballers
Association football forwards
III liga players
Ekstraklasa players
Aris Thessaloniki F.C. players
OFI Crete F.C. players
Bałtyk Gdynia players
Legia Warsaw players
Legia Warsaw II players
Górnik Zabrze players
Polish expatriate footballers
Polish expatriate sportspeople in Greece
Expatriate footballers in Greece